Madhavikutty is a 1973 Indian Malayalam film, directed by Thoppil Bhasi and produced by Hari Pothan. The film stars Madhu, Jayabharathi, KPAC Lalitha and Adoor Bhasi in the lead roles. The film had musical score by G. Devarajan.

Cast
Madhu
Jayabharathi
KPAC Lalitha
Adoor Bhasi
Sankaradi
Sreelatha Namboothiri
T. R. Omana
Vijayakumar
Bahadoor
M. G. Soman

Soundtrack
The music was composed by G. Devarajan and the lyrics were written by Vayalar Ramavarma.

References

External links
 

1973 films
1970s Malayalam-language films
Films directed by Thoppil Bhasi